Ellmenreich is a German surname. Notable people with the surname include:

Albert Ellmenreich (1816–1905), German actor, writer, singer, and composer
Franziska Ellmenreich (1847–1931), German stage actress

German-language surnames